Battle of Sarakhs may refer to;

Battle of Sarakhs (1038), a battle between the Ghaznavid Empire and the Seljuks
Battle of Sarakhs (1459), part of the Timurid Civil Wars